Sonya Eddy (June 17, 1967 – December 19, 2022) was an American actress.

Early life and education
Eddy was born in Concord, California, on June 17, 1967. She majored in theatre and dance at University of California, Davis and received her B.A. in 1992.

Career

Eddy made her acting debut  in the Ruby Dee's play Zora Is My Name in 1990. Other stage credits included The Comedy of Errors, The Witch in Stephen Sondheim's Into the Woods and Bloody Mary in South Pacific.

She moved to Los Angeles and appeared in such sitcoms as Married... with Children, The Drew Carey Show, Murphy Brown, Seinfeld and Home Improvement. From 2004 to 2005, she had a recurring role on Joan of Arcadia. In 2006, Eddy began playing Epiphany Johnson on General Hospital on a recurring basis. From 2007 to 2008, she was a regular cast member on the spin-off, General Hospital: Night Shift. From 2016 to 2019, she played Tammy in the truTV comedy series, Those Who Can't.

Death
Eddy died on December 19, 2022, at the age of 55. Her cause of death was an infection after non-emergency surgery.

Filmography

Film

Television

Video games

References

External links

1967 births
2022 deaths
Actresses from California
African-American actresses
American film actresses
American soap opera actresses
American television actresses
American video game actresses
American voice actresses
American nurses
American women nurses
People from Concord, California
University of California, Davis alumni
20th-century American actresses
21st-century American actresses
20th-century African-American women
20th-century African-American people
21st-century African-American women
21st-century African-American people
African-American nurses